Sorkheh Gav (also Romanized as Sorkheh Gāv; also known as Sirfagef, Sorkheh Kāv, and Syrfagef) is a village in Mavazekhan-e Shomali Rural District, Khvajeh District, Heris County, East Azerbaijan Province, Iran. At the 2006 census, its population was 150, in 32 families.

References 

Populated places in Heris County